Monticello School District are the schools in Independent School District 882, serving the city of Monticello in the US state of Minnesota and surrounding area (townships of Clearwater, Monticello, and Silver Creek).

Jim Johnson became superintendent circa 2005, and he resigned effective July 6, 2017. Michael Favor became the interim superintendent.

Schools
 Secondary schools
Monticello High School (Grades 9-12)
Monticello Middle School (Grades 6-8)

Elementary schools (Grades K-5)
Pinewood Elementary
Little Mountain Elementary
Eastview Elementary

Athletics
The Moose Sherritt Ice Arena, attached to the Middle School, was completed in 2005 due to the efforts of the Monticello–Annandale–Maple Lake Youth Hockey Organization, community members, the mayor, the city council, the school board, businesses and the Sherritt family.  "Moose" Sherritt played for the NHL's Detroit Red Wings and the USHL's Minneapolis Millers among other teams in the 1940s.

References

External links
Website of Monticello School District

School districts in Minnesota
Education in Wright County, Minnesota